Salvatore Greco may refer to:
Salvatore "Ciaschiteddu" Greco (1923–1978), Sicilian Mafia boss
Salvatore "The Engineer" Greco (born 1924), Sicilian Mafia boss
Salvatore "The Senator" Greco, member of the Greco Mafia clan
Salvatore Greco (actor), featured on the German TV series Alles was zählt
Salvatore Greco (politician), leader of the Italian political party Apulia First of All
Salvatore Greco (violinist) (born 1964), Italian violinist